Benjamin Chinedum Okeke is an Anglican bishop in Nigeria.

Okeke was educated at Archdeacon Denis Junior Seminary.
He was elected Bishop of Orlu to succeed Bennett Okoro on 23 August 2019 at St. Peter's Chapel, Ibru International Ecumenical Centre, Agbarha Otor, Delta State, and consecrated  at All Saints Anglican Church Amaifeke, Orlu in September 2019.

Notes

Living people
Anglican bishops of Orlu
21st-century Anglican bishops in Nigeria
Year of birth missing (living people)